HD 113538 b is an exoplanet approximately 51 light years away from Earth in the constellation Centaurus. It orbits its star (HD 113538) once every 263.3 days, placing it in the outer edge of the habitable zone. However it is most likely a gas giant with no solid surface.

References

https://archive.today/20130412183516/http://voparis-exoplanet-new.obspm.fr/catalog/hd_113538_b/

Exoplanets discovered in 2010
Giant planets in the habitable zone